The 2016 Honduran Supercup was a match arranged by the Honduran Liga Nacional which took place on 30 December 2016 between Juticalpa F.C., winners of the 2015–16 Honduran Cup and Club Deportivo Olimpia, winners of the 2015–16 Liga Nacional (Clausura tournament).

Qualified teams

Background
Both Juticalpa F.C. and Club Deportivo Olimpia qualified as reigning champions of the 2015–16 season (Cup and League respectively).  Juticalpa defeated Real C.D. España in the Cup final with a 2–1 score.  Meanwhile, Olimpia was crowned as 2015–16 Clausura champions after convincingly overcoming in the finals against C.D. Real Sociedad with a 5–2 global result.

The previous match between both sides ended with a 1–2 away win to Olimpia at Estadio Juan Ramón Brevé Vargas on 2 November 2016 in a league encounter.

Match
The game started at 19:00 CST as scheduled.  Club Deportivo Olimpia entered the field with their alternate uniform, while Juticalpa F.C. used their home kits.  Olimpia's recently signed midfielder Brayan Velásquez opened the scoreboard at the 24th minute.  Before the end of the first half, Olimpia's coach Héctor Vargas instructed his players to abandon the match claiming that Juticalpa was playing too violent and the referee was being too permissive.  Minutes after, Olimpia decided to resume the game.  The second half started despite the first one didn't end.  Adding to the controversy, referee Héctor Núñez, who had sent-off Olimpia's defender Elmer Güity in the first half, allowed Olimpia to make a substitution in the second half and let them resume the match with eleven players; failing to execute Law 12.  Michaell Chirinos (66th) and Óscar Salas (81st) sealed the victory and gave Olimpia its 3rd ever Honduran Supercup.

See also
 2016–17 Honduran Liga Nacional
 2017 Honduran Cup

References

Honduran Supercup
Supercup